Newbury may refer to:

Places

United Kingdom
 Newbury, Berkshire, a town
 Newbury (district), Berkshire, a district formed in 1974
 Newbury (UK Parliament constituency)
 Newbury, Kent, a hamlet
 Newbury, Somerset, a hamlet

United States
 Newbury, Connecticut, former name of Brookfield
 Newbury, Kansas, an unincorporated community
 Newbury, Massachusetts, a town
 Newbury, New Hampshire, a town
 Newbury (town), Vermont
 Newbury (village), Vermont, within the town
 Newbury Township, LaGrange County, Indiana
 Newbury Township, Geauga County, Ohio

Elsewhere
 Newbury, Victoria, Australia, a locality
 Newbury, Ontario, Canada, a village
 Newbury, New Zealand, a rural community

Schools
 Newbury Biblical Institute, renamed Boston University in 1869
 Newbury Seminary, the oldest predecessor of Vermont College of Fine Arts
 Newbury College (England), a further education college
 Newbury College (United States), a career-focused college in Brookline, Massachusetts
 Newbury Academy, an alternative high school in Dumont, New Jersey
 Newbury High School, a former school in Newbury Township, Geauga County, Ohio

Sports
 Newbury Racecourse, adjoining Newbury, Berkshire, UK
 Newbury F.C., a football club in Newbury, Berkshire
 A.F.C. Newbury, a short-lived football club in Newbury, Berkshire
 Newbury R.F.C., a rugby union club in Newbury, Berkshire

Transportation
 Newbury Buses, a bus brand
 Newbury bypass, which bypasses Newbury, Berkshire, UK
 Newbury Manflier, a human-powered aircraft designed by Nicholas Goodhart
 Newbury Park tube station
 Newbury railway station
 Newbury Road, the main street in Newbury Park, California
 Newbury Street, Boston, Massachusetts

Military
 First Battle of Newbury
 Second Battle of Newbury
 , several ships of the Royal Navy

People
 Newbury (surname)

Other uses
 Newbery Medal, an award for children's literature
 Newbury Castle, west of Newbury, Bershire
 The Newbury Boston, a historic luxury hotel
 Newbury Dam, South Africa

See also
 
 New Bury, a suburb of Farnworth in the Bolton district of Greater Manchester
 Newbery (disambiguation)
 Newberry (disambiguation)